The Victoria Cougars are a junior "B" ice hockey team based in Victoria, British Columbia, Canada. They are members of the South Division of the Vancouver Island Junior Hockey League (VIJHL). The Cougars play their home games at Archie Browning Arena, located in Esquimalt, British Columbia. 

The Cougars joined the league in 1998 as an expansion team. In its VIJHL history, the team has won the Cyclone Taylor Cup once, in 2007. The Cougars have won the Brent Patterson Memorial Trophy Eight times in 2005, 2007, 2008, 2012, 2013, 2014, 2016 and 2019 as league Playoff Champions. They have also won the Andy Hebenton Trophy nine times, as the team with the league's best regular season record in 2007–08, 2010–11, 2011–12, 2012–13, 2013–14, 2014–15, 2015–16, 2016-17, and 2019-2020.

History

In March 2005, the Victoria Cougars won their first Brent Patterson Memorial Trophy, and won the bronze medal at the Cyclone Taylor Cup provincial championships.

They followed that up with their best regular season record in the 2006-07 season, going 39-6-0-3 for 81 points, and a winning percentage of 0.840, second best in the province. In the 2007 playoffs the Cougars won their second VIJHL playoff championship in three years. They then hosted the Cyclone Taylor Cup provincial Junior "B" championships at Esquimalt’s Archie Browning Sports Centre, and won the tournament, defeating the Abbotsford Pilots 4-1 to earn the title of the best Junior "B" team in the province in their ninth year of operation.

The Cougars have captured the regular season championship in the 2007–08, 2010–11, 2011–12, 2012–13, 2013–14, 2014–15, 2015–16, 2016-17, and 2019-2020 seasons; they have been in the VIJHL Finals 13 times, capturing eight Brent Patterson Memorial Trophy's. In 2012-13 they set a new league record, winning 45 of 48 games, losing once in regulation and twice in overtime. In the same season former player and current Head Coach, Brody Coulter, set the VIJHL record for points in a season. In 48 games Coulter scored 118 points (39G 79A 2.5 PPG).

Season-by-season record

 Victoria Hosted in 2007 and 2016
Round Robin records only stored online dating back to 2011

Awards and trophies
Cyclone Taylor Cup
2006-07

Brent Patterson Memorial Trophy
2004-05, 2006–07, 2007–08, 2011–12, 2012–13, 2013–14, 2015–16, 2018-19

Andy Hebenton Trophy
2007-08, 2010–11, 2011–12, 2012–13, 2013–14, 2014–15, 2015–16, 2016-17

Grant Peart Memorial Trophy
1997-98, 2004–05, 2005–06, 2007–08, 2011–12, 2013–14, 2016–17

Doug Morton Trophy
Daryl Boyer: 1999-00
Daryl Boyer: 2000-01
Mark Van Helvoirt: 2001-02
Karl Carveth: 2004-05
Michael Hammond: 2005-06
Steve Axford: 2011-12 (tied with Ty Jones (Braves))
Brody Coulter: 2012-13
Sam Mcmullen: 2014-15
Nathan Looysen: 2015-16

Top Forward
Brody Coulter: 2011-12
Sam Mcmullen: 2014-15
Nathan Looysen: 2015-16

Jack Kingston Memorial Trophy
Cam Smith: 2005-06
Jacob Koistinen: 2007-08
Adam Steenbergen: 2008-09
Kevan McBean: 2018-19Jamie Benn Trophy
Adam Steenbergen: 2009-10
Brody Coulter: 2012-13
Sam Mcmullen: 2014-15
Nathan Looysen: 2015-16

Jamie Robertson Trophy
Michael Hammond: 2005-06

Larry Lamoureaux Trophy
Ryan Fuzi: 2000-01
Brandon Wong: 2001-02
Matt Thomson: 2003-04
Michael Hammond: 2005-06
Steven Axford: 2007-08
Samuel Rice: 2008-09

Ray's Sports Centre Trophy
Matt Thomson: 2003-04
Matt Thomson: 2005-06
Corey Koop: 2009-10
Evan Roch 2011-12
Anthony Ciurro 2015-16

Walt McWilliams Memorial Trophy
Tim Simpson: 2002-03
Mark Walton: 2012-13
Mark Walton: 2013-14

Coach of the Year
Mark Van Helvoirt 2011-12

External links
 Official website of the Victoria Cougars

Ice hockey teams in British Columbia
Cougars
1998 establishments in British Columbia
Ice hockey clubs established in 1998